The Peninsula Symphony is an American symphony orchestra, based in the San Francisco Peninsula, California.  The orchestra consists of over 90 community musicians.  In 1995, the Peninsula Symphony was featured in a PBS broadcast.

Since its beginning, the symphony has performed four pairs of concerts in October, January, March, and May.  It also performs two free concerts each year, an outdoor summer concert, and a spring family concert.  The symphony also hosts competitions, presents awards for young artists, and organizes outreach programs in local schools, known as Bridges to Music.  A special Bridges to Music program for children with disabilities was started in 2016 by Board member and principal second violinist Deborah Passanisi.  Each school year, the program culminates in a concert for teachers and parents, with the young performers singing and accompanied by a guitarist.

Mitchell Sardou Klein has been Music Director and Conductor of the Peninsula Symphony since 1985, and also directs the Peninsula Youth Orchestra. Assistant Conductor is a rotating position, held by Hoh Chen as of the 70th season.

Mission and history

Mission Statement:
The mission of the Peninsula Symphony is to enrich the lives of people in our community with inspiring, innovative, high-quality musical presentations at affordable prices, and to promote music education through engaging programs for children and adults.

History:
The Peninsula Symphony was founded by Russian-born violinist/conductor Aaron Sten.  In 1949, Aaron Sten became conductor of a small Redwood City group of musicians that he met while buying a house.  Shortly after, a group of about 32 San Mateo musicians under the name The Peninsula Symphony disbanded and joined Aaron Sten's group.  The resulting group of about 60 musicians formed an orchestra under the name Sequoia Symphony Orchestra and performed their first season.  By the end of the second season, the name had changed to the Peninsula Symphony and in 1951, the non-profit Peninsula Symphony Association was incorporated. In that very first year, many features were established which were to become trademarks of the Peninsula Symphony: four concerts in October, January, March, and May; a balanced musical program featuring first-class guest artists; an attractive concert program with informative notes; and strong support from the community. In 1951, under Vincent Guida, symphony clarinetist and business manager, the organization was incorporated as a non-profit association, and a formal board was chosen.

In 1952, Aaron Sten also founded the California Youth Symphony, and began the tradition of incorporating outstanding young musicians into Peninsula Symphony performances.  In 1956, Board President Robert L. Clark was the driving force behind the creation of the Peninsula Symphony Auxiliary, a women's volunteer group, which was instrumental to the development of an audience base. With no office or Executive Director yet, volunteers played a crucial role in symphony operations.  In 1985, the symphony opened an office with executive director to manage its growth
.

By 1985, the time had come to open an office in San Mateo and hire a paid Executive Director. Coincidentally, this was also the last year of founding conductor Aaron Sten’s leadership.

With the arrival of current conductor Mitchell Sardou Klein, the Peninsula Symphony grew from a grassroots ensemble to a polished 90-plus member orchestra of well-trained community musicians. Following Sten’s tradition of nurturing young musicians, the Peninsula Youth Orchestra was established in the spring of 1997, with Mitchell Sardou Klein serving as the Music Director. The business office moved to Los Altos in 2001.

Music directors
Mitchell Sardou Klein (1985–present), is the Music Director and Conductor of the Peninsula Symphony and founding Music Director of the Peninsula Youth Orchestra (PYO). He regularly guest conducts orchestras in California, throughout the United States, and in Europe.

He made his debut with Symphony Silicon Valley in two sold-out performances in 2012, praised by the San José Mercury News as a “gorgeous performance; big, enveloping and wonderfully luxuriant.” His other appearances as a guest conductor in California include the San José Symphony, Santa Rosa Symphony, the Inland Empire/Riverside Philharmonic, Ballet San Jose, the California Riverside Ballet and the Livermore-Amador Philharmonic. Concerts elsewhere have included his return to Europe to guest conduct the New Polish Philharmonic and the Suddettic Philharmonic, concert tours of England, France, Spain, Italy, Germany, Austria, Czech Republic, Hungary, Belgium, the Netherlands, Japan, Australia and New Zealand with PYO, numerous return engagements to the San Jose Symphony (the predecessor of Symphony Silicon Valley), and his return to the podium of the Santa Cruz County Symphony. Prior guest conducting appearances have included the Seattle Symphony, New Polish Philharmonic, Suddetic Philharmonic,  Richmond Symphony, Eastern Philharmonic, Flagstaff Festival Symphony, Amarillo Symphony, Lexington Philharmonic, South Bend Symphony, and many others. Maestro Klein also has extensive experience in conducting ballet orchestras, including the Kansas City Ballet, Lone Star Ballet, Oakland Ballet, and Westport Ballet, as well as the Theater Ballet of San Francisco and les Ballets Trockadero de Monte Carlo.

Klein directed over a hundred concerts as Associate Conductor of the Kansas City Philharmonic (where he was also Principal Pops Conductor and Principal Conductor of Starlight Theater, the Philharmonic’s summer home), and also served as Music Director of the Santa Cruz County Symphony.

Critics have consistently praised Klein's work. The San José Mercury News described his performance with Symphony Silicon Valley in 2012 as a “gorgeous performance; big, enveloping and wonderfully luxuriant.”  The San Mateo County Times described him in 2007 as “Super Conductor: Mitchell Sardou Klein, music director of the Peninsula Symphony, led his musicians through another triumphant concert.  The Peninsula Symphony just keeps getting better and better.  Great works and great performances by all.”  The Polish newspaper Gazeta Wyborcza proclaimed, “The American conductor quickly established a fine rapport with his orchestra.  Klein is a musician who has the musical score in his head, rather than his head in the score, which he demonstrated ably.  The creative conception and artistic shape which he brings to his work comes from deep inside him.”

Klein is a winner of many prestigious awards, including the 2008 Diamond Award for Best Individual Artist from the Peninsula Arts Council, the Silver Lei Award from the 2009 Honolulu Film Awards (for the World Premiere of Giancarlo Aquilanti’s La Poverta), the 2000 ASCAP Award for Programming of American Music on Foreign Tour, the 2001 Julie Billiart Award from the College of Notre Dame for Outstanding Community Service, a 1996 award for the year’s best television performance program in the Western States (for the one-hour PBS program about him and the Peninsula Symphony, called Music Making: A Joyful Vocation) as well as the Hillbarn Theatre's 1993 BRAVO! Award for his contribution to the Bay Area’s cultural life.

Klein was born in New York City, into a musical family that included members of the Claremont String Quartet and Budapest String Quartet. He began cello studies at age four with his father, Irving Klein, founder of the Claremont String Quartet. His mother, Elaine Hartong Klein, danced with the Metropolitan Opera Ballet.

Since 1984, he has been Director of the Irving M. Klein International String Competition. Held in San Francisco each June, the Competition has become one of the most prominent in the world, featuring prizes totaling over $25,000 USD, attracting applicants from more than twenty nations annually, and launching numerous major international concert careers.

Cited for his “keen judgment, tight orchestral discipline, feeling for tempo, and unerring control,” Klein has conducted many significant world, American, and West Coast premieres, including works by Bohuslav Martinu, Meyer Kupferman, Joan Tower, Hans Kox, George Barati, Benjamin Lees, Giancarlo Aguilanti, Melissa Hui, Rodion Shchedrin, Brian Holmes, Ron Miller, Lee Actor, Jonathan Russell, Alvin Brehm, and Margaret Garwood. He has appeared frequently on national and international broadcasts, including National Public Radio, the Voice of America, the WFMT Fine Arts Network, PBS Television, and KQED television. He lives in Oakland, California with his wife, violist Patricia Whaley. Their daughter, Elizabeth, lives and works in the Bay Area.

Aaron Sten (1949–1985)

Assistant conductors

The Peninsula Symphony maintains an ongoing Assistant Conductor position for up and coming conductors.  These conductors are usually responsible for leading one piece per subscription concert, organizing and conducting the annual family concert, and serving as personnel manager for the orchestra.

Hoh Chen (2018–present)
Chad Goodman (2016–2018)
Nathaniel Berman (2012–2016)
Jessica Bejarano (2008-2012)
Geoffrey Gallegos (2003-2007)
Thomas Shoebotham (2001-2003)
Howard Rappaport (1999-2000)
Sara Jobin (1997-1998)

Youth competitions

The symphony also has a tradition of incorporating outstanding young musicians, such as the winners of the Irving M. Klein International String Competition, Marilyn Mindell Piano Competition, and Young Musicians' Competition into its performances.  Some notable examples are Cathy Basrak, Frank Huang, Jennifer Koh, and Robert deMaine.

Premieres

The symphony seeks out premieres and commissioned works.  For its 50th season (May 1999), the Peninsula Symphony commissioned notable composer Melissa Hui to create Always, a work for taiko, chorus, and orchestra.  The symphony has also commissioned Leaving Bai-Di by the Chinese-American composer Gang Situ in March 2008, and Lee Actor's Concerto for Piano and Orchestra in May 2013.  In May 2018 the symphony performed the West Coast premiere of Garages of the Valley by Mason Bates.

Guest artists

The Peninsula Symphony has a tradition of bringing guest soloists for concerts.  Some notable examples are:

Soyeon Kate Lee, piano
 Renee Rapier, mezzo-soprano
Joyce Yang, piano
David Benoit, jazz piano
Conrad Tao, piano
Emi Ferguson, flute
Garrick Ohlsson, piano
Taylor Eigsti, jazz piano
Dayna Stephens, saxophone
John O'Conor, piano
Quartet San Francisco, string quartet
Elizabeth Pitcairn, violin
Jon Nakamatsu, piano
Angel Romero, classical guitar
Larry Adler, harmonica
Chris Brubeck, Dan Brubeck, jazz musicians
Jiebing Chen, erhu
Eroica Trio, piano trio
Grant Johannesen, piano
Jerome Lowenthal, piano
Marni Nixon, soprano
Christopher O'Riley, piano
Richard Woodhams, oboe
Nicanor Zabaleta, harp

Performance venues
Centered in the San Francisco Peninsula, the Peninsula Symphony has performed at several local performance halls.  These include the Flint Center, San Mateo Performing Arts Center, Fox Theatre (Redwood City, California), Bing Concert Hall, Spangenberg Theatre, and Stanford Memorial Church.

References

External links
 Official site

Musical groups from the San Francisco Bay Area
Musical groups established in 1949
Orchestras based in California
1949 establishments in California